Anthony Lewis (born 8 December 1966) is a British illustrator of children's books. His work includes The Owl Tree by Jenny Nimmo, which won the 2004 Nestlé Smarties Book Prize in the 6– to 8-year-old readers category, and Atticus the Storyteller's 100 Greek Myths by Lucy Coats, which was shortlisted for the 2004 Blue Peter Book Awards, Best Illustrated Book to Read Aloud.

Anthony Lewis lives in Manley, Cheshire.

References

External links

 
 
 

1966 births
British children's book illustrators
Living people
Place of birth missing (living people)